Huang Zhanzhong (born 5 November 1968) is a Chinese badminton player. He won the men's doubles title at the 1995 Asian Cup, and was part of Chinese team that won the 1990 Asian Games and 1995 Sudirman Cup. Huang competed in the men's doubles tournament at the 1996 Summer Olympics.

Career 
Huang is a Wenzhou, Zhejiang natives, who started to know sport since he was in elementary school. His skills were discovered during a badminton talent identification program by Zhejiang province team in 1979, when he was 11 years old. Although he started the training from the basics, Huang immediately shown a good progress in the men's doubles, and then after won some national tournaments, he was selected to join national team in Beijing in 1989.

Huang reached his first Grand Prix tournament finals at the 1989 China Open with his partner Zheng Yumin, but the duo defeated by Malaysian pair Jalani and Razif Sidek in rubber games. He later helps Chinese team won the 1989 Asian Championships held in Shanghai, beating Indonesian team 5–0, then the men's team event at the 1990 Asian Games defeating Malaysian team 5–0.

In 1991, Huang reached four Grand Prix tournament finals in Finland, Singapore, China, and Hong Kong, and then won his first title in Denmark Open. Huang and Zheng Yumin were qualified to compete at the World Grand Prix Finals, advanced to final round, but lost again to Jalani and Razif Sidek of Malaysia. In December 1991, he and Zheng also won a bronze medal at the Asian Cup after lost the semifinals match to Rexy Mainaky and Ricky Subagja of Indonesia.

In 1992, Huang won a silver medal at the Asian Championships in the men's doubles event with Zheng Yumin. Unfortunately, he and Zheng failed to qualified at the 1992 Summer Olympics, since their points were not enough to be able to take part at that Games. He then could not give his best in the rest tournament after the Olympic Games, without a single title, only finished as finalists in Hong Kong and Thailand Open.

In 1993, Huang won his second Grand Prix men's doubles title at the Korea Open with Zheng Yumin. He then participated at the East Asian Games held in Shanghai, won a gold in the men's team and a silver medal in the men's doubles with Liu Di. In 1994, he won the China Open with his new partner Jiang Xin, and won bronze medals at Asian Championships and Asian Games. In 1995, he and Jiang Xin won the Asian Cup, China Open, Thailand Open, and was a member of Chinese winning team at the Sudirman Cup.
 
After retired from the national team, he works as a coach in Zhejiang team.

Achievements

Asian Games 
Men's doubles

Asian Championships 
Men's doubles

Asian Cup 
Men's doubles

East Asian Games 
Men's doubles

IBF World Grand Prix 
The World Badminton Grand Prix sanctioned by International Badminton Federation (IBF) since from 1983 to 2006.

Men's doubles

References

External links 
 

1968 births
Living people
Sportspeople from Wenzhou
Badminton players from Zhejiang
Chinese male badminton players
Badminton players at the 1996 Summer Olympics
Olympic badminton players of China
Badminton players at the 1990 Asian Games
Badminton players at the 1994 Asian Games
Asian Games gold medalists for China
Asian Games bronze medalists for China
Asian Games medalists in badminton
Medalists at the 1990 Asian Games
Medalists at the 1994 Asian Games
Chinese badminton coaches
World No. 1 badminton players
20th-century Chinese people